Monty Wright (born 1969) is a retired British boxer.

Boxing career
He represented England in the -81 kg light-heavyweight division, at the 1990 Commonwealth Games in Auckland, New Zealand.

He turned professional on 10 November 1993 and fought in 23 fights, winning 18 and losing 5.

References

1969 births
Living people
British male boxers
Boxers at the 1990 Commonwealth Games
Light-heavyweight boxers
Commonwealth Games competitors for England